The National Court Reporters Association, or NCRA, is a US organization for the advancement of the profession of the court reporter, closed captioner, and realtime writer. The association holds annual conventions, seminars and forums, speed and real-time contests, and teachers' workshops to assist court reporters.

Reporters can join NCRA for a fee that varies depending on whether the applicant is a student, teacher, or reporter.
Membership allows a reporter to take the certifications, get discounts on conventions, attend conferences, and have access to a network of other professionals in the field.

History
NCRA was established in 1899 in Chicago, Illinois, United States as the National Shorthand Reporters Association (NSRA).
They created standardization of ethical codes, transcript rates, and information for all shorthand reporters.
They published "The Shorthand Writer" and started the National Speed Contest, which is still held today. NCRA developed the first standardized test for court reporters to gauge their proficiency. Called the Certificate of Proficiency, it was replaced by the Registered Professional Reporter.

Membership with NCRA
NCRA supports individuals through education and certification, promotion of the stenographic profession throughout the legal industry, and defense of the industry in government. NCRA provides news and information to its members through email newsletters and its JCR magazine, as well as on its website.

Standardized tests
NCRA offers three main certifications:
 RPR, Registered Professional Reporter
 RMR, Registered Merit Reporter
 RDR, Registered Diplomate Reporter, the highest certification designated by NCRA

They have established seven other certification programs:
 CRR, Certified Realtime Reporter
 CBC, Certified Broadcast Captioner
 CCP, Certified CART Provider
 CRC, Certified Realtime Captioner
 CLVS, Certified Legal Video Specialist
 CRI, Certified Reporting Instructor
 MCRI, Master Certified Reporting Instructor
 CMRS, Certified Manager of Reporting Services
 CPE, Certified Program Evaluator
 RSA, Realtime Systems Administrator 

The written knowledge portion of the exams is offered four times a year at Pearson VUE Professional Centers, and the skills portion of the exams is offered twice a year at NCRA-sponsored testing sites.

Certified Schools
Although the NCRA is not an accrediting agency, they have established general requirements and minimum standards expected of a court reporting school. The following schools have met those requirements as of 2012:

Alabama
 Gadsden State Community College
 Prince Institute of Professional Studies

Arizona
 GateWay Community College

California
 Bryan College of Court Reporting
 Sage College
 South Coast College
 West Valley College
 Marin Community College

Colorado
 Prince Institute

Florida
 Atlantic Technical Center
 Erwin Technical Center
 Key College
 Sheridan Technical Center

Georgia
 Brown College of Court Reporting

Illinois
 MacCormac College
 Midstate College
 South Suburban College

Indiana
 College of Court Reporting Inc.

Kansas
 Butler Community College

Michigan
 Academy of Court Reporting
 Macomb Community College Center for Cont. Edu

Minnesota
 Anoka Technical College

Mississippi
 Hinds Community College

Missouri
 St. Louis Community College Meramec

Nevada
 Everest College

New Jersey
 StenoTech Career Institute, Fairfield
 StenoTech Career Institute, Piscataway

New Mexico
 Central New Mexico Community College

New York
 Alfred State College
 Business Informatics Center
 Long Island Business Institute
 New York Career Institute

Ohio
 Clark State Community College
 Cuyahoga Community College
 Miami-Jacobs Career College, Columbus
 Miami-Jacobs Career College, Independence
 Miami-Jacobs Career College, Sharonville
 Stark State College of Technology
 Stautzenberger College, Brecksville
 Stautzenberger College, Maumee

Pennsylvania
 Community College of Allegheny County
 Orleans Technical Institute

South Dakota
 Colorado Technical University

Texas
 Alvin Community College
 Arlington Career Institute
 Court Reporting Institute of Dallas
 Court Reporting Institute of Houston
 Kussad Institute of Court Reporting

Washington
 Green River Community College

West Virginia
 Huntington Junior College

Wisconsin
 Lakeshore Technical College
 Madison Area Technical College

Canada
 Canadian Centre for Verbatim Studies
 Northern Alberta Institute of Technology

References

Professional associations based in the United States
Court reporting